Fjordia browni is a species of sea slug, an aeolid nudibranch, a marine gastropod mollusc in the family Flabellinidae.

Distribution
This species was described from Ireland. It is a fairly common species found in exposed sites from northern France to Norway.

Description
This Fjordia has a narrow body and cerata in well defined clusters. The cerata have a broad band of white pigment at the tip.

Ecology
The diet of this species is a hydroid, Tubularia indivisa.

References

Flabellinidae
Gastropods described in 1980